Brachygalea kalchbergi is a moth of the family Noctuidae. The species was first described by Otto Staudinger in 1897. It is known only from Israel and Jordan.

Adults are on wing from March to April. There is one generation per year.

External links

Cuculliinae
Moths of the Middle East
Moths described in 1897